The Constitution provides for freedom of religion, and the Government generally respected this right in practice. However, government officials continued to have the authority to research and monitor religious groups that are not officially recognized. There were few reports of societal abuses or discrimination based on religious belief or practice. Some reports of discrimination against minority religious groups surfaced, as well.

Religious demography

The Government of Belgium does not keep statistics listing religious affiliation but the population is predominantly Roman Catholic, according to a 2006 government report and a university study issued in 2000. According to a separate survey issued in 2000, which surveyed philosophical orientation based on self-identification, 47 percent of the population identify themselves as practicing Catholics, but a slightly larger number, 57.3 percent, identify themselves as belonging to the Catholic Church. Fifteen percent identify themselves as being Christian, but neither Catholic nor Protestant. Being a part of the Church doesn't mean "believer" in Belgium, since it has been a tradition to baptize your children for a long time in Belgian culture. The country consists of 42-43% non-believers.

The number of adherents belonging to smaller religious groups are: Islam, 400,000 adherents: Protestantism, 140,000; Orthodox, 70,000; Jewish, 55,000; and Anglicanism 11,000. The larger nonrecognized religions include Jehovah's Witnesses (25,000 baptized, 50,000 "churchgoers"). Estimates for other bodies include the independent Protestant congregations, 10,000; Buddhists, 10,000; members of the Church of Jesus Christ of Latter-day Saints (Mormons), 4,000; Seventh-day Adventists, 2,000; Hindus, 5,000; Sikhs, 3,000; Hare Krishnas, 1,500; and the Church of Scientology, 200-300.

A 2005 report of the Université Libre de Bruxelles estimates that 15 percent of the Catholic population regularly attend religious services, and 10 percent of the Muslim population are "practicing Muslims."

Despite these limited numbers, religion continues to play a role in some life events in Belgium: 25.6 percent of couples opt for a marriage in the Church, 58.4 percent of funerals include religious services and 54.6 percent of the children born in the country are baptized. Only 8.5 percent of the population went to the church on Christmas in 2007.

In Brussels, the capital city of Belgium, religious events are in huge decline. Only 7.2 percent opt for a marriage in the Church, 22.6 percent of the funerals include religious services and 14.8 of the children born in Brussels are baptized.

Status of religious freedom

Legal and policy framework
The Constitution provides for freedom of religion, and the Government generally respected this right in practice.

The Government accords "recognized" status to Catholicism, Protestantism (including Evangelicals and Pentecostals), Judaism, Anglicanism (separately from other Protestant groups), Islam, and Orthodox (Greek and Russian). Representative bodies for these religious groups receive subsidies from government revenues. The Government also supports the freedom to participate in secular organizations. These secular humanist groups serve as a seventh recognized "religion," and their organizing body, the Central Council of Non-Religious Philosophical Communities of Belgium, receives funds and benefits similar to those of the other recognized religious groups.

The federal Government and Parliament have responsibility for recognizing religious groups and paying the wages and pensions of ministers of those groups. As a result of constitutional reform enacted in 2001, federal authorities devolved responsibility for ensuring religious instruction, financial accountability of religious groups, and religious buildings to other levels of government. For example, while parish operations and the upkeep of churches fall under municipal authorities, the provinces sustain the cost of mosque buildings. At the same time, the Flemish, Francophone and German-language community governments pay religious teacher salaries and the costs of public broadcasting.

In 2007 the federal Government paid $134 million (€103 million) to the recognized religious groups. This sum included $15.2 million (€11.7 million) to lay organizations, and $8.7 million (€6.7 million) to Islamic religious groups. For 2006 the federal budget outlays totaled $127 million (€98 million). According to data supplied by the Justice Ministry, in 2006 the federal Government made salary payments to 3,021 Catholic priests, 110 Protestant/Evangelical and 12 Anglican ministers, 35 rabbis, 48 Orthodox priests, and 247 lay consultants. The federal and regional authorities continued to deliberate with the Muslim Council on the criteria for providing payments to Muslim clerics. In the absence of an agreement, no such payments were made during the period covered by this report. The total outlays by all levels of government (for religious education and by municipal authorities for buildings) amounted to approximately $780.62 million (approximately €580 million). Note: the 2006 report erroneously used Belgian francs instead of euros.

The public educational system, from kindergarten to university, requires strict neutrality of presentation of religious views for teaching personnel, except for teachers of religion. Religious or "moral" instruction is mandatory in public schools and is provided according to the student's religious or nonreligious preference. All public schools provide teachers for each of the six recognized religions, if a sufficient number of pupils wish to attend. Public school religion teachers are nominated by a committee from their religious group and appointed by the Minister of Education of the respective community governments. Private authorized religious schools that follow the same curriculum as public schools are known as "free" schools. They receive community government subsidies for operating expenses and buildings. Teachers, like other civil servants, are paid by their respective community governments.

The Government applies five criteria in deciding whether to grant recognition to a religious group: the religion must have a structure or hierarchy; the group must have a sufficient number of members; the religion must have existed in the country for a long period of time; it must offer a social value to the public; and it must abide by the laws of the state and respect public order. These criteria are not listed in decrees or laws, and the Government does not formally define "sufficient," "long period of time," or "social value." A religious group seeking official recognition applies to the Ministry of Justice, which then conducts a thorough review before recommending approval or rejection. Final approval of recognized status is the responsibility of Parliament alone; however, Parliament generally accepts the decision of the Ministry of Justice. A group whose application is refused by the Ministry of Justice may appeal the decision to the Council of State.

On November 7, 2006, a committee of experts appointed by the Justice Minister made some recommendations for amending the financing system. They refrained from advocating a complete overhaul, pointing out that a system whereby the individual taxpayer would make a contribution to the religious group of his choice, might violate the Constitution and the prevailing privacy laws. Also on November 7, 2006, Cardinal Godfried Danneels, head of the Belgian Catholic Church, publicly acknowledged that the financing system in place discriminated in favor of the Catholic Church, adding that he would not resist the change.

On March 30, 2007, the federal Government reached agreement on the text on a draft bill aimed at recognizing Buddhism as a "non-confessional philosophical community." The Government had not set a date for submitting the bill to Parliament, which was dissolved in May prior to elections in June. The Justice Minister announced that the Buddhist national secretariat would receive subsidies and ministers would receive pay starting in 2008. No progress was reported on the Government's talks with the Armenian Church on the possibility of recognition. Talks continued with other small religious communities on ways to provide state financial support. The lack of recognized status does not prevent a religious group from practicing freely and openly. Thus, while unrecognized groups do not qualify for government subsidies, they may qualify for tax-exempt status as nonprofit organizations.

On November 19, 2006, Flemish members of the Muslim Executive, a 17-member committee which acts as one of the primary liaisons between the Muslim community and the Government, asked that the Executive be split into two separate executives. The members argued that the Executive, which is divided into separate Flemish and Francophone wings, was spending too much time on issues in Francophone areas. The Flemish members argued to Justice Minister Onkelinx that two separate executives would allow each to operate more independently and therefore spend more time on issues relevant to their respective areas. The last elections for the Executive were held in 2006, a year after the Executive Council was created by the Muslim Council. Beyazgul Coksun was elected chairman and both the Flemish and Francophone wings have a vice chair. The Muslim community received official recognition from the government in 1974.

At the end of 2006 both the Flemish and Francophone community governments were considering how to train imams for religious teaching. The two governments set as benchmarks academic training at the same level as for the ministers of the other recognized religious groups, and training dispensed in association with the Muslim Executive Council.

In 2005 the Antwerp Appellate Court, the highest court to address the issue, ruled it was outside the jurisdiction of the state to determine whether the Muslim faith requires women to wear a headscarf.

In 1993 the Government established by law the Center for Equal Opportunity and the Struggle against Racism (CEOOR). Commonly known as the Anti-Racism Center, it is an independent agency responsible for addressing all types of discrimination, including religious. Although formally part of the Office of the Prime Minister, it is under the guidance of the Ministry of Social Integration. Its head is appointed by the Prime Minister for six years, but the Prime Minister may not remove the individual once appointed.

In March 2006 the Ministry of Justice introduced a mechanism to identify offenses of racist, xenophobic or homophobic actions, thus making it easier to prosecute discrimination as a criminal act. The Minister decided to appoint a magistrate in each judicial district in charge of monitoring racism and discrimination cases. In addition, the College of Prosecutors General, a government body on which senior prosecutors serve, issued a directive on identifying violations of anti-racism and anti-discrimination legislation.

Restrictions on religious freedom
Government policy and practice contributed to the generally free practice of religion; however, Parliament, the courts, police, government agencies and special interest groups continued to research and monitor religious groups that are not on the official list of recognized religions.

As a result of a 1997 parliamentary commission committee report, Parliament passed a law establishing two bodies: a group monitoring "harmful sects" and an interagency coordinating group on "harmful sects." The first body, the Center for Information and Advice on Harmful Sectarian Organizations (CIAOSN), collects publicly available information on a wide range of religious and philosophical groups and provides information to the public and, upon request, gives advice to the authorities on sectarian organizations. Since its inception, the CIAOSN has opened 750 files concerning sectarian organizations. The Center's library is open to the public and contains information on religion in general, as well as on specific religious groups, including information provided by those groups. The Center has the authority to share with the public any information it collects on religious sects; however, it does not have the authority to provide assessments of individual sectarian organizations to the general public. Despite its name, regulations prohibit it from categorizing any particular group as harmful. Unlike the Anti-Racism Center, this body cannot initiate litigation.

The second body established by Parliament, the Interagency Coordination Group, deals primarily with confidential material and works with the legal and security institutions of the Government to coordinate government policy. Through a 2005 Royal Decree the group's composition was changed to include representatives from the College of Prosecutors General; the Federal Prosecuting Office; the Federal Police; State Security; Defense Intelligence; and the Justice, Interior, Foreign, and Finance Ministries. The Coordinating Group's executive board meets quarterly and reports to the full group. It produces no publicly available reports. The Government designated the federal prosecutor and a magistrate in each of the 27 judicial districts to monitor cases involving sects.

Regarding the Interagency Coordination Group, a parliamentary committee, the Parliamentary Investigatory Committee on Sects (PICS), found that the Government had failed, together with the College of Prosecutors General, to determine the official guidelines for prosecuting offenders. Created in 2002 the Federal Prosecuting Office is handling several cases involving sectarian organizations that formally remain open but on which no action has been taken for several years, and the Office has not yet issued any injunctions. Moreover, Parliament was undecided about amending the criminal code to include a special section on "offenses committed by sectarian organizations." In the absence of such special legislation, sectarian organizations can be investigated on such grounds as embezzlement, money laundering, abuse of confidence, misappropriation of wills, illegal medical practice, and fraud.

On June 1, 2006, the country's highest court ruled that Parliament's immunity could not be subjected to restrictions, after the President of the Chamber of Representatives argued that a 2005 ruling, regarding damages the Church of the Kingdom of God suffered by appearing in a parliamentary report, undermined the legislative authority and independence of lawmakers.

On December 12, 2006, the Brussels Appellate Court ruled that the Interior Minister had wrongly denied a visa to Sun Myung Moon, founder of the Unification Church. It ordered the Immigration Office to issue a visa, allowing Mr. Moon to attend a rally in the country.

Most queries handled by the CIAOSN in 2006 concerned physical welfare and therapeutic organizations (15 percent), Protestant denominations (13.5 percent), Oriental religious groups (10.5 percent), small religions (6 percent), New Age (6 percent), Scientology (5.5 percent), Catholic and dissident Catholic organizations (4 percent) and Jehovah's Witnesses (4 percent).

In keeping with trends seen across Europe of role reversal of 19th-century missionary activity, PICS mentioned in its 2006 report, an increasing number of queries about organizations originating from Northern American Protestant and African evangelical movements.

PICS noted that since it was established in 1999 the queries coming from the public had shifted from sectarian organizations to those offering mental and physical healing, generated by a rapidly growing number of groupings and organizations, often hard to identify.

In its recommendations, PICS also requested that brainwashing and mental manipulation be established as criminal offenses. In keeping with the committee's recommendation, the Government submitted to Parliament draft legislation aimed at including an additional chapter in the criminal code regarding "abuse of an individual's ignorance or weakness." Parliament took no action on the bill before its dissolution, meaning that the measure will have to be re-submitted when the new legislature convenes after the 2007 general election.

In its 2006 report PICS reported no changes regarding State Security, which monitors sectarian organizations. In 2005 the committee reported that, in their view, State Security had violated the privacy of an individual; however, they found that State Security was right to warn child care organizations about one sectarian organization.

On several occasions in 2006 and 2007, a member of parliament raised concern about a company having provided computer courses to Belgian ministerial departments and the Flemish regional parliament. He alleged that the company was linked to the Church of Scientology International (CSI). He also expressed concern about Narconon, an organization linked to CSI that seeks to enter schools with an anti-drugs campaign.

According to the Federal Prosecuting Office, the 2004 criminal investigation into the Belgian Church of Scientology's operations was completed, but the magistrate who announced the decision did not mention precisely when this had occurred. The federal prosecuting authorities made no official statements regarding the start of a trial date by the end of the reporting period.

As they are not one of the recognized religions, the Mormons had in the past expressed some concern about the status of their local workers. The informal agreement under which a number of missionaries are allowed to operate in the country is an item for discussions with the new federal Government which will be formed following the 2007 general election.

In June 2006 the Brussels Appellate Court ruled in a summary trial that the CIAOSN had wrongly identified Sahaya Yoga as a dangerous sect in one of its publications. The court ordered the CIAOSN to make public the ruling and to inform its website and annual report readers, which it is doing during the period covered by this report.

On April 19, 2006, the Brussels First Instance court sentenced Luong Minh Dang, the founder of Spiritual Human Yoga (SHY) and his former representative in the country to four-years imprisonment, with a suspended sentence for half of its term, and a $2,600 fine (2,000 €) for forgery, swindling, illegal use of medicine and criminal conspiracy. The trial concerned the two defendants personally, not SHY as an organization. The court issued an international arrest warrant against Mr. Dang who had left the country. The defendants appealed the court ruling, making the case ongoing during the period covered by the report.

During this reporting period, contrary to previous years, there were no reports in Flanders or elsewhere of Jehovah's Witnesses being discriminated against by courts in child custody proceedings.

On January 11, 2007, the Charleroi Chamber of Indictment formally indicted an Aramaic Catholic priest for violation of anti-racism legislation in connection with remarks the priest made against Islam on television in 2002. On April 2, 2007, a higher court refused to quash the indictment.

On January 15, 2007, a measure banning the wearing of headscarves by municipal employees engaged in dealing with the Antwerp public came into effect, during the course of negotiations on formation of a coalition to govern the city. The measure prompted a protest by local trade unions, but remained in force. The Brussels regional government issued a similar ban for all its employees, but the decision caused no protest. Faced with the same issue, the municipal authorities in Ghent decided against issuing a directive on the subject. The issue did not arise at the federal level, where there are no specific directives on wearing religious symbols, with the notable exception of judges, police officers, and other uniformed officials.

There were no reports of religious prisoners or detainees in the country, or of forced religious conversion.

Anti-Semitism
The Jewish community registered 66 anti-Semitic incidents during 2006, compared to 60 incidents during the previous year. (Data was unavailable for the complete reporting period.) The Center for Equal Opportunity and the Fight against Racism counted 63 incidents in 2006. In 2006 most incidents took place in Brussels (30) and in Antwerp (10) (with the remaining elsewhere in the country). Reports noted that physical violence decreased in 2006, while there was a significant increase in ideological incidents, such as shouting abuse and anti-Jewish graffiti. As in the past, most of the incidents appeared to have been generated from the Muslim immigrant community.

On June 15, 2007, a trial resumed against Roeland Raes, a former vice chairman and senator of the far-right Vlaams Blok party. The proceeding started in March 2007 and charged Mr. Raes with denying the Holocaust during a 2001 television broadcast. Federal law prohibits public statements that incite national, racial, or religious hatred, including denial of the Holocaust. The maximum sentence for Holocaust denial is one year's imprisonment.

On March 2, 2007, a Hasselt judge handed down a sentence stipulating community service or alternatively seven months imprisonment to a man who spat and shouted anti-Semitic abuse at Israeli players during a 2005 soccer match between Belgium and Israel.

On November 30, 2006, a group of Chasidic teens from Antwerp was attacked by young Muslims in northeast Belgium. The group of 60 13- to 15-year-olds arrived at their hotel in Beringen, in a largely Muslim neighbourhood, when 10 local Muslims approached them and threw stones and shouted anti-Semitic epithets. Leaders of the Jewish group called the police. Undeterred by the arrival of the police, the youths continued throwing stones at the building. The attackers appeared in a district court and were sentenced to community service.

CEOOR also reported an increase in anti-Semitic incidents due to the July–August conflict involving Israel and Hezbollah. Before the war the organization received one or two complaints of anti-Semitism per week; after hostilities commenced they received about one complaint per day. The complaints generally involved Internet hate messages and anti-Semitic letters and articles in the press. In addition, CEOOR reported anti-Semitic graffiti on Jewish homes and insults against Jews on the streets. An official investigation was under way at the end of 2006 to determine responsibility, but had yet to be completed by the end of the reporting period.

On the evening of July 24, 2006, vandals destroyed documents, windows, and the memorial's crypt of the National Monument for the Jewish Martyrs of Anderlecht. The crypt included an urn containing ashes from Auschwitz, which vandals damaged and emptied. The memorial, in the Anderlecht quarter of Brussels, was a previous target of desecration. There were no reported arrests but the investigation continues, according to authorities.

On July 5, 2006, a young man of North African origin yelled anti-Semitic insults while passing two Jewish boys who were walking outside the yeshiva (Talmud school) in Wilrijk (Antwerp). The North African man returned shortly later with some friends to assault the Jewish boys. One boy was badly hurt and the other boy escaped. The perpetrators were not found despite a police investigation.

Observers noted that courts in the country were becoming less lenient on anti-Semitic offenses and that an increasing number of judges had taken such cases. Legislation passed in March 2006 has made it easier to prosecute anti-Semitic acts, along with other forms of racism and xenophobia.

Societal abuses and discrimination
Some religious groups reported incidents of discrimination, particularly against Jews and Muslims, as well as religious groups that have not been accorded official "recognized" status by the government.

In 2006 CEOOR received a total of 75 complaints citing religion as the basis of the alleged discrimination. These religion-based cases represented 5 percent of all complaints.

At the national level, there is an annual general assembly of the National Ecumenical Commission to discuss various religious themes. The Catholic Church sponsors working groups at the national level to maintain dialogue and promote tolerance among all religious groups. At the local level, Catholic dioceses established commissions for interfaith dialogue. The president of the National Ecumenical Commission, a Catholic organization, maintains contacts with leaders of other religious groups, including both recognized and unrecognized religious groups.

Several nongovernmental organizations (NGOs), each acting in a private capacity, are also active in promoting religious freedom. Among the most prominent are the Movement against Racism, Anti-Semitism, and Xenophobia; the Ligue des Droits de l'Homme; Human Rights without Frontiers; and the Liga voor Mensenrechten.

Although opposition to bans against head scarves and burqas had a vocal following, support for bans remained widespread and popular. That said, the issue was not a major topic during the campaign preceding the June 10, 2007, federal elections.

In 2005 the Center for Equal Opportunity issued a comprehensive report on public symbols of religious and philosophical convictions. The report found that neither the Flemish nor the Francophone educational authorities imposed restrictions, and it was left to individual schoolmasters to decide which symbols would be tolerated. Most schoolmasters in the country imposed a headscarf ban on both pupils and teachers. A survey released in 2006 showed that 90 percent of the schools in the Francophone community did not permit the headscarf. Schools on both sides of the country's linguistic border allow free days for attending religious festivals. Catholic educational institutions, the largest educational body in the country, allowed the wearing of religious symbols. Schoolmasters also refused to permit the use of religious objections against attendance of specific courses, notably including physical education classes.

On July 11, 2006, the appeal board of the Brussels public schools ruled against reinstating two teachers who had been dismissed for wearing a headscarf. The head of the Brussels public schools argued that his schools had to remain neutral in religious matters, and that the teachers had broken an agreement to follow the school system's dress policy when they had signed their employment contract.

As of November 2006, there were reportedly only two schools remaining in Antwerp that permitted Muslim girls to wear the headscarf, and immigrant rights groups protested that the federal Government should intervene, as Muslim girls were being deprived of their rights and the opportunity to have an education at the school of their choice. There is strong societal support to view education as an exclusively local or linguistic community issue, and as such, outside the federal Government's authority. No federal intervention occurred during the period covered by this report.

See also
Religion in Belgium
Human rights in Belgium

References

 United States Bureau of Democracy, Human Rights and Labor. Belgium: International Religious Freedom Report 2007. This article incorporates text from this source, which is in the public domain.

Belgium
Human rights in Belgium
Religion in Belgium